Club Deportivo Covadonga is a Spanish football team based in Oviedo, in the autonomous community of Asturias. Founded in 1979 it plays in Tercera División RFEF – Group 2, holding home games at Estadio Juan Antonio Álvarez Rabanal, with a 2,000-seat capacity.

History
CD Covadonga was founded in 1979 by José Antonio Álvarez Rabanal, priest of the parish of Our Lady of Covadonga, Oviedo, with the aim to give a way to development as people to the local youth.

It started to play its games in the Asturian Regional divisions in the field of the Fundación Masaveu while the club was negotiating with the Oviedo City Hall for the transfer of a piece of ground in Los Castañales, neighbourhood of Teatinos, for building a new football field.

In 1998 the team promoted for the first time to Tercera División. Fifteen years later, in 2013, the club finished the league in third position and qualifies for the 2013 Tercera División play-offs, but it was eliminated in the first round by Don Benito.

Covadonga repeated participation in the playoffs in 2019, but was clearly defeated again in the first round, this time by Bergantiños. However, the club achieved promotion in their third attempt, after defeating Llanera and Caudal in the playoffs.

Season to season

1 season in Segunda División B
16 seasons in Tercera División
1 season in Tercera División RFEF

Current squad

Famous players
 Iván Ania
 Santi Cazorla (youth)

Women's team
On 26 November 2017, CD Covadonga announced the creation of a new women's team that would start competing in the 2018–19 season. It previously existed until it was disbanded in 1997.

Season by season

References

External links
Official website 
BDFutbol team profile
Futbolme team profile 

Sport in Oviedo
Football clubs in Asturias
Association football clubs established in 1979
1979 establishments in Spain